Powelliphanta hochstetteri bicolor, known as one of the amber snails, is a subspecies of large, carnivorous land snail, a terrestrial pulmonate gastropod mollusc in the family Rhytididae.

Distribution
This species occurs in New Zealand

Life cycle
The shape of the eggs is oval, and they are usually not constant in their dimensions, on average they are 10.75 × 9 mm.

Conservation status
Powelliphanta hochstetteri bicolor is classified by the New Zealand Department of Conservation as being in Gradual Decline.

References

 New Zealand Department of Conservation Threatened Species Classification

Powelliphanta
Taxa named by Arthur William Baden Powell
Endemic fauna of New Zealand
Endemic molluscs of New Zealand